Sanders Ngabo (born 4 July 2004) is a Danish professional footballer who plays as a midfielder for the Danish club Lyngby.

Club career
A youth product of Sundby BK, Ngabo moved to the youth academy of Lyngby in 2021. After working his way up their U19s, he was promoted to their senior squad in 2021 in the Danish 1st Division. He made his professional debut in a 2–1 win over Nykøbing on 25 July 2021. He signed a professional contract with Lyngby on 7 August 2021 for 3 years. In his debut season with Lyngby, he helped the club come in second and earn promotion into the Danish Superliga.

International career
Ngabo was born in Denmark and is of Burundian descent. He is a youth international for Denmark, having played for the Denmark U18s and U19s.

References

External links
 
 DBU Profile

2004 births
Living people
Footballers from Copenhagen
Danish men's footballers
Denmark youth international footballers
Danish people of Rwandan descent
Association football midfielders
Lyngby Boldklub players
Danish Superliga players
Danish 1st Division players